Jay Hunt may refer to:

Jay Hunt (television executive) (born 1967), former controller of BBC One
Jay Hunt (director) (1855–1932), American film director and actor
Jay Hunt (stylist) (born 1966), British stylist and TV presenter